CID16020046 is a compound which acts as an inverse agonist at the former orphan receptor GPR55, and may be the first selective inverse agonist characterised for this receptor. It was found to block a number of GPR55 mediated responses such as wound healing and activation of immune system T-cells and B-cells, as well as showing inverse agonist activity in the absence of GPR55 agonist stimulation. However while it was found to have good selectivity over the related CB1 and CB2 cannabinoid receptors as well as a number of other targets, CID16020046 has not yet been tested against another related receptor GPR18, so its selectivity for GPR55 over this target has not been established.  It has antiinflammatory actions, has been used to study the interaction between GPR55 mediated and CB1 mediated activity, and research using this compound has revealed a role for GPR55 in learning and memory.

See also 
 O-1918
 PSB-CB5
 PSB-SB-487

References 

Cannabinoids